Laguna Carapã is a municipality located in the Brazilian state of Mato Grosso do Sul. Its population was 7,419 (2020) and its area is 1,734 km².

The footballer Juninho Cabral is from Laguna.

References

Municipalities in Mato Grosso do Sul